Xu Yifan and Yang Zhaoxuan defeated Shuko Aoyama and Chan Hao-ching in the final, 7–5, 6–0 to win the doubles tennis title at the 2022 Silicon Valley Classic.

Darija Jurak Schreiber and Andreja Klepač were the reigning champions, but chose not to defend their title.

Seeds

Draw

Draw

References

External links
Main draw

Silicon Valley Classic - Doubles
2022 Doubles